Brian Kiteley (September 26, 1956) is an American novelist, and writing teacher.

Life
He grew up in Northampton, Massachusetts.
He has had residencies from the MacDowell Colony, Millay, Yaddo, and the Fine Arts Work Center.
He has taught at the American University in Cairo, Ohio University.
He teaches at the University of Denver.

Awards
 1991 NEA Fellowship
 1992 Guggenheim Fellowship
 1996 Whiting Award

Works

Non-fiction

Anthologies

References

External links
Profile at The Whiting Foundation
"Q&A: Brian Kiteley", Tarpaulin Sky, Selah Saterstrom, V4N2, Fall Winter 2006
"On Brian Kiteley", Iowa Review, Spring 1996
"'River Gods' A Tribute To Author's Hometown", NPR, Alan Cheuse

20th-century American novelists
Living people
Academic staff of The American University in Cairo
Ohio University faculty
University of Denver faculty
21st-century American novelists
American male novelists
American expatriates in Egypt
20th-century American male writers
21st-century American male writers
Novelists from Ohio
Novelists from Colorado
20th-century American non-fiction writers
21st-century American non-fiction writers
American male non-fiction writers
1956 births
City College of New York alumni